Jorge Miguel Lopes Xavier (born 19 May 2001), known as Jójó, is a Portuguese professional footballer who plays as a central defender for Belenenses SAD.

Club career
Jójó is a product of the youth academies of Amadora, Benfica and Belenenses SAD. He made his professional debut with B-SAD in a 1–0 Taça da Liga loss to Mafra on 24 July 2021. He signed his first professional contract with B-SAD on 6 August 2021.

Personal life
Born in Portugal, Jójó is of Cape Verdean descent.

References

External links

2001 births
Living people
Footballers from Lisbon
Portuguese footballers
Portuguese people of Cape Verdean descent
Association football defenders
Belenenses SAD players
Primeira Liga players
Campeonato de Portugal (league) players